Ihor Shopin (born 15 June 1978) is a Ukrainian footballer. Shopin played for FC Zakarpattia Uzhhorod for three years and transferred to Shakhtar Sverdlovsk after the Ukrainian Premier League 2009-10.

External links 

 FC Shakhtar Sverdlovsk Official Website Squad

1978 births
Living people
Ukrainian footballers
FC Zorya Luhansk players
FC Hoverla Uzhhorod players
FC Shakhtar Sverdlovsk players
Ukrainian Premier League players
Ukrainian First League players
Ukrainian Second League players

Association football midfielders